Alessandro Argenton (born 11 February 1937) is a former Italian equestrian who won a silver medal at the Olympic Games.

Biography
Born Cividale del Friuli, Argenton made six appearances at the Summer Olympics.

Olympic results

See also
 List of athletes with the most appearances at Olympic Games

References

External links
 
 

1937 births
Living people
Olympic equestrians of Italy
Italian male equestrians
Olympic silver medalists for Italy
Equestrians at the 1960 Summer Olympics
Equestrians at the 1964 Summer Olympics
Equestrians at the 1968 Summer Olympics
Equestrians at the 1972 Summer Olympics
Equestrians at the 1976 Summer Olympics
Italian event riders
Medalists at the 1972 Summer Olympics